Alexa may refer to:

Technology 
Amazon Alexa, a virtual assistant developed by Amazon
 Alexa Internet, a defunct website ranking and traffic analysis service
 Arri Alexa, a digital motion picture camera

People 
Alexa (name), a given name and surname
AleXa, American pop singer based in South Korea

Other uses 
 Alexa (plant), a genus of legumes
 Alexa (typeface), a typeface
 2013 Middle East cold snap, also referred to as Alexa
 One Night's Intoxication, a 1951 German film released in Austria as Alexa